Misc. Music is a compilation album by Unbelievable Truth, released on the Shifty Disco label in 2001.

It consists of two CDs, the first containing unreleased tracks and B-sides from throughout their career, the second a recording of their farewell show held at the Zodiac in Oxford on 16 September 2000.

Track listing

Disc one
Unreleased/B-Sides
"Live Without This" - 3:52
"Building" [Shifty Disco single version] - 5:30
"Roadside No 2" - 3:55
"Landslide" [acoustic] - 2:58
"In the Beginning" - 4:41
"Believe in Anger" - 3:10
"Some of These People" - 2:02
"Nightlight" - 4:01
"Over" - 3:59
"History / Fiction" - 3:20
"Unwanted Gift" - 3:55
"Ciao! My Shining Star" - 3:42
"All This Time" - 2:57
"Heaven Sent Me" - 3:15
"Mea Culpa" - 3:45
"Everyone Has to Eat" - 3:56
"Disaster" - 3:41
"Whose Side Are You On?" - 2:20
"Roadside No 1" [live] - 2:54
 The live version of Roadside No 1 is a hidden track at end of 18, starting at 6:32.
 Tracks 1, 4, 5, 6, 7, 9, 10, 11, 12, 13, 15, 17, 18 and 19 are previously unreleased.

Disc two
Live
"Almost Here" [live] - 4:38
"Pedestrian" [live] - 3:36
"Landslide" [live] - 3:16
"Who's to Know" [live] - 5:21
"Stone" [live] - 3:46
"Home Again" [live] - 3:17
"Daylight" [live] - 5:24
"Hypnotist" [live] - 3:39
"Higher Than Reason" [live] - 4:11
"Forget About Me" [live] - 4:16
"Covers" [live] - 2:40
"From This Height" [live] - 3:22
"Building" [live] - 5:09
"Agony" [live] - 2:58
"Finest Little Space" [live] - 4:06
"Solved" [live] - 3:43
"I Can't Wait" [live] - 10:25
 All tracks previously unreleased

Personnel
Andy Yorke - guitar, vocals
Nigel Powell - drums, percussion, backing vocals, keyboards, guitar, bass
Jason Moulster - bass, backing vocals, guitar
Jim Crosskey - guitar, keyboards

References

2001 albums
Unbelievable Truth albums